Lucie Borhyová (born 16 April 1978) is a Czech television presenter, who reads the news for Czech television channel TV Nova. She started her career in August 1999, having previously worked for Nova as a programme assistant. Borhyová was named "most popular female" in the TV Nova Anno 2007 awards. She was awarded "television news personality of the year" in the TýTý Awards in 2012 and 2013. In 2007 she took part in the celebrity dancing television series, Bailando.

Personal life
Borhyová has a son, Lucas, from a relationship with Nico Papadakis. She also has a daughter, Linda, from a relationship with Michal Hrdlička. Having been together with Hrdlička since 2012, Borhyová announced their split in October 2015.

References

1978 births
Living people
Mass media people from Prague
Czech television presenters
Czech women television presenters